Glennon Edward Engleman (February 6, 1927 – March 3, 1999) was an American dentist, contract killer, and serial killer. Engleman, a United States Army veteran and a St. Louis dentist, planned and carried out at least five murders for monetary gain over the course of 30 years. He was already serving two life sentences in a Missouri state prison when he pled guilty to the murder of a man and his wealthy parents in a separate contract killing that occurred in Illinois. Engleman was a sociopath, once stating that his talent was to kill without remorse, and he enjoyed planning and carrying out killings and disposing of the remains in order that it would net him financial rewards.
His first known killing occurred in collaboration with his ex-wife. His ex-wife Ruth married another man, raised his life insurance and then Engleman killed him, both sharing the benefits. Later he would repeat these tactics for other murders.

Engleman would use his financial worth, sex and charm to manipulate women he was close to, ex-wives, lovers and his dental assistant, in helping him formulate and execute elaborate murder schemes. This led to one of his lovers, Barbara Boyle, being convicted as an accomplice and serving just under half of a 50-year sentence. Another accomplice, Robert Handy, was also convicted and served time in prison. Methods used to kill his victims included shooting, bludgeoning with a sledgehammer and explosives. The exact number of his victims is unknown.

He is the subject of Susan Crane Bakos 1988 book Appointment for Murder. The cases against him were re-enacted in a rare, two-part episode of the crime documentary series "The FBI Files".

Early life
Engleman was born the youngest of four children, his father was a member of the United States Air Force. He was raised in the middle class and lived in a nice home that his parents owned. Academically he was an above average student in school, but he didn't excel in any specific subject.

He graduated in dentistry at Washington University in St. Louis, in 1954. He had been admitted under the GI Bill, having previously served in the US Army Air Corps.

Known victims
1958: Engleman is suspected of the death of James Stanley Bullock, 27, a clerk for Union Electric Company of Missouri and part-time student. Shot near the St. Louis Art Museum. Edna Ruth Bullock (née Ball) and James Bullock were married on June 28, 1958, they had been married for five and half months on the date he was murdered. Edna Ruth Bullock was Engleman's ex-wife prior to her marriage with James Bullock. She collected $64,000 from James Bullock's life insurance.

1963: Engleman is suspected in the murder of Eric Frey, a business associate of Engleman at Pacific Drag Strip, in which Frey and Engleman were partners. Engleman struck him with a rock, pushed him down a well and used dynamite to blow him up afterwards. He then divided the insurance proceeds with Frey's widow.

1976: Peter J. Halm was shot in Pacific, Missouri. His wife, Carmen Miranda Halm, a former dental assistant trainee who had worked for Engleman and known him since childhood, ordered the hit to collect a $60,000 policy of life insurance on Halm. Engleman was convicted of capital murder for killing Halm and sentenced to life in prison with no possibility of parole for 50 years.

1977: Arthur and Vernita Gusewelle at their farmhouse near Edwardsville, Illinois. Arthur was shot; Vernita bashed to death. Engleman then murdered their son Ronald Gusewelle in East St. Louis, Illinois 17 months later so his widow Barbara Gusewelle Boyle could claim the millions in life insurance she had taken out on her husband, the sole heir to his parents' oil business. Boyle collected approximately $340,000 following her husband's murder. Boyle was convicted in her husband's murder but was acquitted of killing his parents. She was subsequently sentenced to 50 years in prison for the murder of her husband. She was released from the Dwight Correctional Center on October 10, 2009. Robert Handy, the accomplice, pled guilty to conspiring to commit the three Gusewelle killings and was sentenced to 14 years and served his time in prison. Engleman confessed to the three killings while in prison. He later pled guilty to the murders and received three life terms without parole.

1980: Sophie Marie Barrera, owner of South St Louis Dental Laboratory. Killed in car bomb explosion. Engleman owed her over $14,000. On 25 September 1980, a jury in federal court found Engleman guilty of mail fraud and conspiracy to commit mail fraud in the murder of Barrera. He was sentenced to a total of 60 years in prison for the two charges. Engleman was accused of the murder by her son, Frederick Barrera. Engleman was also convicted in state court of capital murder for killing Berrera, receiving a life sentence with no possibility of parole for 50 years after jurors spared him a death sentence.

Family and death
Engleman was married twice, first to Edna Ruth and then to Carmen Miranda Halm, with whom he had a son, David Engleman. His first marriage Edna Ruth was when they both planned and decided on their method of killing. Edna Ruth Ball married another man, raised her new husband's life insurance, Engleman killed him and they both shared the profits. Edna Ruth was never prosecuted due to lack of evidence.

In March 1999, Engleman, 72, was pronounced dead in the infirmary of the Jefferson City Correctional Center, where he had a history of treatment for diabetes. A spokesman for the center said his death had been anticipated.

In media

Books
Appointment for Murder - Story of the Killing Dentist (1989), by: Susan Crain Bakos.

Television
Engleman's killings inspired the basis for the 1996 film, The Dentist.
The story was told in the episode "Concealed Abscess" on the Investigation Discovery series Deadly Dentists, which aired December 8, 2017.

See also
 List of serial killers in the United States

References

External links
 Annual Report of the Attorney General of the United States 1980, pg. 77 at National Criminal Justice Reference Service

1927 births
1999 deaths
American dentists
American people convicted of murder
American people who died in prison custody
American prisoners sentenced to life imprisonment
Contract killers
People convicted of murder by Missouri
Prisoners sentenced to life imprisonment by Missouri
Prisoners who died in Missouri detention
United States Army Air Forces personnel of World War II
People with antisocial personality disorder
Deaths from diabetes
20th-century dentists
Washington University School of Dental Medicine alumni